Malabar College of Engineering and Technology is a private engineering college situated in Wadakkancherry, Thrissur District of Kerala, India. The college is affiliated to All India Council for Technical Education (AICTE) New Delhi, and the University of Calicut, and the Kalam technical University (KTU)

References

External links
 

Engineering colleges in Thrissur district
All India Council for Technical Education
Colleges affiliated with the University of Calicut